The mixed doubles tournament of the 2015 BWF World Championships (World Badminton Championships) took place from August 10 to 16. Zhang Nan and Zhao Yunlei enter the competition as the current champions.

Seeds

  Zhang Nan / Zhao Yunlei (Champion)
  Xu Chen / Ma Jin (Semifinals)
  Tontowi Ahmad / Liliyana Natsir (Semifinals)
  Liu Cheng / Bao Yixin (Final)
  Joachim Fischer Nielsen / Christinna Pedersen (3rd round)
  Lu Kai / Huang Yaqiong (3rd round)
  Chris Adcock / Gabby Adcock (Quarterfinals)
  Ko Sung-hyun / Kim Ha-na (Quarterfinals)

  Lee Chun Hei / Chau Hoi Wah (2nd round)
  Riky Widianto / Richi Puspita Dili (3rd round)
  Praveen Jordan / Debby Susanto (Quarterfinals)
  Edi Subaktiar / Gloria Emanuelle Widjaja (3rd round)
  Mads Pieler Kolding / Kamilla Rytter Juhl (3rd round)
  Michael Fuchs / Birgit Michels (3rd round)
  Jacco Arends / Selena Piek (Quarterfinals)
  Chan Yun Lung / Tse Ying Suet (2nd round)

Draw

Finals

Section 1

Section 2

Section 3

Section 4

References
BWF Website

2015 BWF World Championships
World Championships